Silent Hours is a psychological thriller film written and directed by Mark Greenstreet. It stars James Weber Brown, Indira Varma, Dervla Kirwan and Hugh Bonneville.

Cast
 James Weber Brown as John Duval
 Indira Varma as Dr. Catherine Benson
 Dervla Kirwan as DI Jane Ambrose
 Hugh Bonneville as Commander William Calthorpe
 Vicki Michelle as Mary Woodward
 Susie Amy as Rosemary Calthorpe
 Alistair Petrie as Lieutenant Charles Carter
 Angela Thorne as 	Mrs. Garvie
 Nikki Kelly as Harriet Blakeney
 Gary Powell as Wilf Tanner
 Cat Simmons as DC June Francis
 Christopher Villiers as George Barton QC
 Timothy Watson as Henry Wright
 Danny Webb as David Frampton
 Andrew Whipp as DS Pinker
 Simon Williams as  Mr. Garvie
 Tom Beard as Mr. Bowles
 Annie Cooper as Tobi Wright
 Elizabeth Healey as Rachel Garvie
 Beth Chalmers as Helen Wilson
 Nathan Hamilton as Johnson
 James Sebastian as Mr. Bowles Jr.

Release
Although the film was originally released as a feature film on 25 September 2015 at the Raindance Film Festival, it was re-edited in 2020 and again re-edited into a three-episode miniseries released in 2020. The episode titles were "The Silent Service", "The Midnight Tide" and "Towards the Sea".

References

External links

2015 films
2015 thriller films
British psychological thriller films
2010s English-language films
2010s British films